South Ray crater is a small crater in the Descartes Highlands of the Moon photographed from the lunar surface by the astronauts of Apollo 16.  The name of the crater was formally adopted by the IAU in 1973.

The Apollo 16 Lunar Module (LM) Orion landed between North Ray and South Ray craters on April 21, 1972.  The astronauts John Young and Charles Duke explored the area between the craters over the course of three EVAs using a Lunar Roving Vehicle, or rover.  They came closest to South Ray on EVA 2, at station 4 (Cinco crater), about 3.9 km south of the landing site.  Duke photographed South Ray from there with a 500-mm lens.

South Ray crater is approximately 700 m in diameter and approximately 120 m deep, with a bright system of rays of ejecta.  The astronauts observed that the ejecta of South Ray was very bouldery, and reported that it would have been difficult or impossible to drive there on their rover.

South Ray cuts into the Cayley Formation of Imbrian age. The crater itself is much younger (Copernican).

External links
 Apollo 16 Traverses, NASA Lunar Photomap 78D2S2(25)
 John Young at South Ray Crater, Lunar Reconnaissance Orbiter, Posted by David Portree on July 05, 2018

References

Apollo 16
Impact craters on the Moon